Trochocarpa (Greek trochos = wheel, carpos = fruit) is a genus of shrubs or small trees, of the plant family Ericaceae. They occur naturally through coastal and montane eastern Australian rainforests and mountain shrublands and in New Guinea, Borneo and Sulawesi (Malesia).

Species
This listing may be incomplete.
Trochocarpa arfakensis  – Arfak Mountains, New Guinea
Trochocarpa bellendenkerensis  – Wet Tropics of NE. Queensland endemic, Australia
Trochocarpa celebica  – C. Sulawesi, N. Borneo (Malesia)
Trochocarpa clarkei  – Victoria Australia
Trochocarpa cunninghamii  – Tasmania, Australia
Trochocarpa dekockii  – New Guinea
Trochocarpa disperma  – New Guinea
Trochocarpa disticha  – Tasmania, Australia
Trochocarpa gjelleruppi  – NW. New Guinea
Trochocarpa gunnii  – Tasmania, Australia
Trochocarpa laurina  – NSW, Qld, Australia, New Guinea
Trochocarpa montana  – NE. NSW restricted endemic, Australia
Trochocarpa nubicola  – New Guinea
Trochocarpa nutans  – New Guinea
Trochocarpa papuana  – New Guinea
Trochocarpa thymifolia  – Australia

Formerly included here
Trochocarpa parviflora  ⇒ Acrotriche parviflora  – WA, Australia

References

Cited works 

 
 

 
Ericaceae genera